The 1844 Ohio gubernatorial election was held on October 8, 1844.

Incumbent Democratic Governor Thomas W. Bartley did not run for re-election.

Bartley's father, Whig nominee Mordecai Bartley defeated Democratic nominee David Tod and Liberty nominee Leicester King.

General election

Candidates
Mordecai Bartley, Whig, former U.S. Representative. Bartley replaced David Spangler who declined the nomination.
David Tod, Democratic, former State Senator
Leicester King, Liberty, Liberty nominee for Governor in 1842

Results

Notes

References

1844
Ohio
Gubernatorial